Daviesia teretifolia is a species of flowering plant in the family Fabaceae and is endemic to the south coast of Western Australia. It is a spreading shrub with tapering cylindrical, sharply pointed phyllodes, and yellow to orange and dark red to black flowers.

Description

Taxonomy
Daviesia teretifolia was first formally described in 1864 by George Bentham in Flora Australiensis from an unpublished description by Robert Brown. The specific epithet (teretifolia) means "terete-leaved".

Distribution and habitat
This daviesia grows in tall shrubland in near-coastal areas of southern Western Australia in the Esperance Plains and Mallee bioregions .

Conservation status
Daviesia teretifolia is classified as "not threatened" by the Western Australian Government Department of Biodiversity, Conservation and Attractions.

References

teretifolia
Taxa named by George Bentham
Plants described in 1864
Flora of Western Australia